Jacques Fansten (born 1946) is a French film director, screenwriter and producer. He has directed 20 films since 1970.

Selected filmography
 Stadium Nuts (1972)
 Little Marcel (1976)

References

External links

1946 births
Living people
French film directors
French male screenwriters
French screenwriters
French film producers
Writers from Paris